The fourth season of the HBO television series Boardwalk Empire premiered on September 8, 2013, and concluded on November 24, 2013, consisting of 12 episodes.  The series was created by Terence Winter and based on the book Boardwalk Empire: The Birth, High Times and Corruption of Atlantic City by Nelson Johnson. Set in Atlantic City, New Jersey, during the Prohibition era, the series stars Steve Buscemi as Enoch "Nucky" Thompson (based on the historical Enoch L. Johnson), a political figure who rose to prominence and controlled Atlantic City, New Jersey, during the Prohibition period of the 1920s and early 1930s. The fourth season takes place between February and August, 1924. The fourth season was released on DVD and Blu-ray in region 1 on August 19, 2014.

Cast and characters

Main cast
Ron Livingston and Jeffrey Wright joined the main cast, while Charlie Cox and Bobby Cannavale departed.

 Steve Buscemi as Enoch "Nucky" Thompson
 Kelly Macdonald as Margaret Thompson
 Michael Shannon as Nelson Van Alden/George Mueller
 Shea Whigham as Elias "Eli" Thompson
 Michael Stuhlbarg as Arnold Rothstein
 Stephen Graham as Al Capone
 Vincent Piazza as Charlie Luciano
 Michael Kenneth Williams as Albert "Chalky" White
 Anthony Laciura as Eddie Kessler
 Paul Sparks as Mickey Doyle
 Jack Huston as Richard Harrow
 Ron Livingston as Roy Phillips
 Jeffrey Wright as Dr. Valentin Narcisse
 Gretchen Mol as Gillian Darmody

Recurring

Episodes

Reception

Critical reception
The fourth season of Boardwalk Empire received positive reviews from critics. On the review aggregator website Metacritic, the fourth season scored 77/100 based on 13 reviews.  Another aggregator website, Rotten Tomatoes, reported 95% of critics gave the fourth season a "Certified Fresh" rating, based on 21 reviews with an average score of 8.2/10, with the site consensus stating "Boardwalk Empire continues to benefit from its meticulously realized period trappings, but what keeps the show watchable is its supremely talented ensemble players."

Awards and nominations
For the 20th Screen Actors Guild Awards, the cast was nominated for Best Drama Ensemble, Steve Buscemi was nominated for Best Drama Actor, and the series was nominated for Best Stunt Team. Jeffrey Wright received a nomination for Best Supporting Actor in a Drama Series for the 4th Critics' Choice Television Awards. For the 66th Primetime Emmy Awards, Tim Van Patten was nominated for Outstanding Directing for a Drama Series for the episode "Farewell Daddy Blues".

References

External links 
 
 

Boardwalk Empire
2013 American television seasons
Fiction set in 1924
Cultural depictions of J. Edgar Hoover